Toni Borevković (born 18 June 1997) is a Croatian professional footballer who plays for Croatian club Hajduk Split, on loan from Vitória de Guimarães as a centre-back.

Career
Born in Slavonski Brod, Croatia, Borevković is a product of local NK Marsonia and NK Marsonia 1909/MV Croatia youth ranks. In June 2018, he started his first experience abroad, joining Rio Ave on a five-year deal. He made his debut on 26 July 2018 in the UEFA Europa League play-offs against Jagiellonia Białystok.

On 8 July 2021, he signed a five-year contract with Vitória de Guimarães.

On 20 June he joins Hajduk on one year loan deal, with 1 milion euro option to buy clause.

Career statistics

References

External links
 
 

1997 births
Living people
Sportspeople from Slavonski Brod
Croatian footballers
Croatia under-21 international footballers
Croatia youth international footballers
Association football defenders
NK Rudeš players
Rio Ave F.C. players
Vitória S.C. players
Croatian Football League players
First Football League (Croatia) players
Primeira Liga players
Croatian expatriate footballers
Croatian expatriate sportspeople in Portugal
Expatriate footballers in Portugal